Christopher Stephen Walls (born 3 August 1952) is a diver who participated in the Individual Springboard event at the 1972 Summer Olympics in Munich.

References

External links
Sports Reference: Olympics Sports

1952 births
Divers at the 1972 Summer Olympics
Living people
Olympic divers of Great Britain